El Sur is a Chilean newspaper published in Concepción and it circulates in almost all the Biobío Region. El Sur is owned by El Sur S.A., which manages two dailies in Concepción: El Sur and Crónica.

External links

 Official site

Newspapers published in Chile
Mass media companies of Chile
Publications established in 1882
Mass media in Concepción, Chile
1882 establishments in Chile